McGraws is an unincorporated community in Wyoming County, West Virginia, United States.

The community was named after John and M. P. McGraw, the original owners of the town site.

References

Unincorporated communities in Wyoming County, West Virginia
Unincorporated communities in West Virginia
Coal towns in West Virginia